The 2019 Africa U-23 Cup of Nations qualification was a men's under-23 football competition, which decided the participating teams of the 2019 Africa U-23 Cup of Nations.

Players born 1 January 1997 or later were eligible to participate in the competition. A total of eight teams qualified to play in the final tournament, including Egypt who qualified automatically as hosts. These matches also served as the first stage of the CAF qualifiers for the 2020 Summer Olympics men's football tournament in Japan.

Teams
Apart from Egypt, the remaining 53 members of CAF were eligible to enter the qualifying competition, and a total of 43 national teams were in the qualifying draw, which was announced on 2 October 2018. The 13 teams which had the best performance in the 2015 Africa U-23 Cup of Nations final tournament and qualifying competition were given a bye to the second round.

Notes
Teams in bold qualified for the final tournament.
(D): Disqualified after draw
(W): Withdrew after draw

Did not enter

Format
Qualification ties were played on a home-and-away, two-legged basis. If the aggregate score was tied after the second leg, away goals rule was applied, and if still tied, penalty shoot-out (no extra time) was used to determine the winner.

Schedule
The schedule of the qualifying rounds was as follows. All matches were played during the FIFA International Window. The third round was originally scheduled for 3–11 June 2019 but was rescheduled to 2–10 September 2019 due to the proximity of its initial dates to the 2019 Africa Cup of Nations between 21 June and 19 July.

Bracket
The bracket of the draw was announced by the CAF on 2 October 2018.

The seven winners of the third round qualified for the final tournament.

First round

|}

Angola won on walkover after Namibia withdrew.

1–1 on aggregate. Mozambique won on away goals.

Malawi won 3–2 on aggregate.

3–3 on aggregate. Burundi won on away goals.

Ghana won 5–2 on aggregate.

Equatorial Guinea won 4–2 on aggregate.

Cameroon won 4–1 on aggregate.

South Sudan won 2–1 on aggregate.

Niger won 4–2 on aggregate.

Guinea won 6–2 on aggregate.

Sudan won 2–1 on aggregate.

Kenya won 8–1 on aggregate.

Libya won on walkover after Gambia withdrew.

DR Congo won 5–0 on aggregate.

Ethiopia won 4–1 on aggregate.

Second round

|}

South Africa won 6–1 on aggregate.

Zimbabwe won 2–0 on aggregate.

Zambia won 2–0 on aggregate.

Congo won 2–1 on aggregate.

Ghana won 4–0 on aggregate.

Algeria won 3–1 on aggregate.

Cameroon won on walkover due to FIFA's suspension of the Sierra Leone Football Association.

Tunisia won 1–0 on aggregate.

Ivory Coast won 8–2 on aggregate.

Guinea won 2–1 on aggregate.

Sudan won 2–0 on aggregate.

Nigeria won 4–2 on aggregate.

DR Congo won 2–1 on aggregate. However, they were later disqualified for fielding an ineligible (overaged) player, and Morocco won on walkover.

Mali won 5–1 on aggregate.

Third round
Winners qualified for 2019 Africa U-23 Cup of Nations. 

|}

South Africa won 5–0 on aggregate.

Zambia won 5–4 on aggregate.

Ghana won 2–1 on aggregate.

2–2 on aggregate. Cameroon won on away goals.

2–2 on aggregate. Ivory Coast won on away goals.

Nigeria won 5–1 on aggregate.

Mali won 2–1 on aggregate.

Qualified teams
The following eight teams qualified for the final tournament.

1 Bold indicates champions for that year. Italic indicates hosts for that year.

Goalscorers

Notes

References

External links
Qualifiers Of Total U-23 Africa Cup Of Nations, CAFOnline.com

Qualification
U-23 Cup of Nations qualification
U-23 Cup of Nations qualification
2018 in youth association football
2019 in youth association football
November 2018 sports events in Africa
December 2018 sports events in Africa
March 2019 sports events in Africa
September 2019 sports events in Africa